Darryl Gamble (born November 17, 1987) is a former American football linebacker. He was signed by the San Diego Chargers as an undrafted free agent in 2011. He played college football at the University of Georgia.

Professional career

San Diego Chargers
Gamble was signed by the San Diego Chargers on July 26, 2011. He had an impressive pre-season debut for the team on August 11, against the Seattle Seahawks. He recorded eight tackles, two of them being for a loss, and had one sack. Gamble was promoted to the active roster on December 20, 2011.

He was cut by the Chargers on August 31, 2012 for final cuts before the start of the 2012 season.

Washington Redskins
On September 3, 2012, Gamble was signed to the practice squad of the Washington Redskins. He was released on November 28.

References

External links
San Diego Chargers bio
Georgia Bulldogs bio

1987 births
Living people
Players of American football from Georgia (U.S. state)
American football linebackers
Georgia Bulldogs football players
San Diego Chargers players